Joachim-Raphaël Boronali was a fictitious Italian painter created as an invention of writer and critic Roland Dorgelès who created paintings on canvas by tying a paintbrush to the tail of a donkey named Lolo.

A painting by the donkey,  (Sunset Over the Adriatic) was exhibited at the 1910 Salon des Indépendants attributed to the 'excessivist' Genoan painter. The painting sold for 400 francs (~ $1200 in 2020 value) and was donated by Dorgelès to the Orphelinat des Arts. The painting forms part of the permanent collection at l'Espace culturel Paul Bédu (Milly-la-Forêt).

See also
Animal-made art 
Pierre Brassau

References

External links 
 Official Tourism Office of Montmartre - Lolo the Donkey

Nonexistent people used in hoaxes
20th-century hoaxes